Force 21 is a real-time strategy game made by Red Storm Entertainment.

Plot summary
The game features a storyline which has US forces fighting PRC forces in the year 2015.

Development and release
It was released in 1999 for Microsoft Windows, and in December 2000 for Game Boy Color. General Franks (who later collaborated with Tom Clancy on a book) consulted for this game.

Reception

The PC version received mixed reviews according to the review aggregation website GameRankings. It sold 9,168 copies in the U.S. by April 2000.

References

External links
 
 

1999 video games
Game Boy Color games
Multiplayer and single-player video games
Real-time strategy video games
Red Storm Entertainment games
Video games developed in the United Kingdom
Video games developed in the United States
Video games set in 2015
Windows games